Loučná may refer to several places in the Czech Republic:

 Loučná nad Desnou, a village in Šumperk District
 Loučná pod Klínovcem, a town in Chomutov District